Renato Sanero (born October 24, 1907 in Turin) was an Italian professional football player.

1907 births
Year of death missing
Italian footballers
Serie A players
S.S. Lazio players
Juventus F.C. players
Atalanta B.C. players
Calcio Padova players
Association football forwards